Persinger may refer to:

Places 
Persinger, West Virginia,  an unincorporated community in Nicholas County, West Virginia, United States
Persinger House is a historic home located at Covington, Alleghany County, Virginia. The original section was built about 1757, and enlarged in 1888.
Persinger Creek, a stream in the U.S. state of West Virginia

People 
Greg Persinger (born 1978), American curler
Louis Persinger (1887–1966),  American violinist and pianist
Michael Persinger (1945–2018),  cognitive neuroscience researcher and university professor with over 200 peer-reviewed publications
Mildred Persinger (born in Roanoke, Virginia, 1918–2018),  American feminist and international activist for non-governmental organizations (NGO)
Raymond Persinger (born 1959),  American artist. Best known for his large bronze sculptures, Persinger runs the sculpture program at the Laguna College of Art and Design (LCAD).
Vicky Persinger (born 1992), American curler